Emplifi is a private company headquartered in New York City. It develops and markets customer experience systems. The business was founded in 2020 after social media analytics company Socialbakers was acquired by customer experience systems business Astute. The combined entity changed its name to Emplifi.

History

Emplifi's predecessor Socialbakers was a social media monitoring and analytics company based in Prague, Czech Republic and founded in 2008. It was focused on finding and analyzing social media posts from customers to identify trends and sentiments, but not on creating content or responding. Its software had modules called Audiences, Influencers, Analytics, and Content, to segregate the various content.

In 2014, Socialbakers acquired Facebook monitoring and analytics company EdgeRank. The next year, Socialbakers co-founder and CEO Jan Rezab resigned and Robert Lang was appointed CEO. By 2016, Socialbakers had 350 employees, about $30–50 million in annual revenues, and had raised $34 million in total funding over the years.

In 2020, customer engagement software company Astute acquired Socialbakers. At the time, Socialbakers was one of the last remaining major independent social media analytics companies. In June 2021, the companies rebranded as Emplifi, and Socialbakers CEO Yuval Ben-Itzhak became president of Emplifi.  The name combines the words "empathy" and "amplification." That September, Emplifi acquired video-streaming service Go Instore. In 2022, Emplifi attained unicorn status with an additional investment that valued the business at more than $1 billion.

Products

Emplifi develops cloud-based services for social media marketing, customer service, and social commerce.

Operations

Emplifi has offices worldwide. As of September 2021, the company reported 750 employees.

References

External links
 

Software companies based in New York City
Software companies established in 2021
Customer experience
Digital marketing companies of the United States
2021 establishments in New York City